Charles Thomas  (1876 – 1935) was a Welsh international footballer. He was part of the Wales national football team between 1899 and 1900, playing 2 matches. He played his first match on 4 March 1899 against Ireland and his last match on 3 February 1900 against Scotland. At club level, he played for Druids where he was Club Captain.

He emigrated to America in 1906 and his football career was ended in March 1907 when his leg was severed by a train in Boston.

See also
 List of Wales international footballers (alphabetical)

References

1876 births
1935 deaths
Welsh footballers
Wales international footballers
Druids F.C. players
Place of birth missing
Association footballers not categorized by position